Salem County is the westernmost county in the U.S. state of New Jersey. Its western boundary is formed by the Delaware River and its eastern terminus is the Delaware Memorial Bridge, which connects the county with New Castle, Delaware. Its county seat is Salem. 

The county lies within the Delaware Valley area. As of the 2020 census, the county retained its position as the state's least-populous county, with a population of 64,837, a decrease of 1,246 (−1.9%) from the 2010 census count of 66,083. The most populous place in Salem County is Pennsville Township with 12,684 residents as of the 2020 Census.

The county constitutes part of the South Jersey region of the state. Salem County, along with adjacent Gloucester County, also in South Jersey, have become an East Coast epicenter for logistics and warehouse construction.

History

Etymology 
The county derives its name from the Hebrew word for "peace".

Early History 
European settlement began with English colonists in the seventeenth century, who were settling both sides of the Delaware River. They established a colonial court in the area in 1681, but Salem County was first formally organized within West Jersey on May 17, 1694, from the Salem Tenth. Pittsgrove Township was transferred to Cumberland County in April 1867, but was restored to Salem County in February 1868. The area was initially settled by Quakers.

The Old Salem County Courthouse, located on the same block as the Salem County Courthouse, serves as the court for Salem City in the 21st century.  It is the oldest active courthouse in New Jersey and is the second oldest courthouse in continuous use in the United States, the oldest being King William County Courthouse in Virginia. The courthouse was built in 1735 during the reign of King George II using locally manufactured bricks. The building was enlarged in 1817 and additionally enlarged and remodeled in 1908. Its distinctive bell tower is essentially unchanged and the original bell sits in the courtroom.

Judge William Hancock of the King's Court presided at the courthouse.  He was later killed by the British in the American Revolutionary War during the massacre at Hancock House committed by the British against local militia during the Salem Raid in 1778.  Afterward the courthouse was the site of the "treason trials," wherein suspected Loyalists were put on trial for having allegedly aided the British during the Salem Raid.  Four men were convicted and sentenced to death for treason; however, they were pardoned by Governor William Livingston and exiled from New Jersey.  The courthouse is also the site of the legend of Colonel Robert Gibbon Johnson's proving the edibility of the tomato. Before 1820, Americans often assumed tomatoes were poisonous. In 1820, Colonel Johnson, according to legend, stood upon the courthouse steps and ate tomatoes in front of a large crowd assembled to watch him do so.

Salem County is notable for its distinctive Quaker-inspired architecture and masonry styles of the 18th century. It had a rural and agricultural economy. In the early 20th century, its towns received numerous immigrants from eastern and southern Europe, who markedly added to the population.  In the period following World War II, the county's population increased due to suburban development.  To accommodate increasing traffic, the Delaware Memorial Bridge was built from Salem County to New Castle, Delaware.

Geography and climate
The county is bordered on the west by the Delaware River, and drained by Salem River, Alloway, and other creeks.

The terrain is almost uniformly flat coastal plain, with minimal relief. Sea level is the lowest point.

The county has a humid subtropical climate (Cfa) and monthly temperatures in Salem city average from 33.2 °F in January to 77.2 °F in July, while in Elmer they average from 33.1 °F in January to 76.8 °F in July.

Climate and weather

Demographics

2020 census
As of the 2020 U.S. census, the county's had 64,837 people, 24,404 households, and 16,880 families. The racial makeup was 79.0% White, 13.1% African American, 0.3% Native American, 1.1% Asian, and 3.7% from two or more races. Hispanic or Latino of any race were 9.8% of the population.

Of the 24,404 households, of which 21.0% had children under the age of 18 living with them, 48.6% were married couples living together, 14.9% had a female householder with no husband present, 5.6% had a male householder with no wife present and 30.8% were non-families, and 12.4% had someone living alone who was 65 years of age or older. The average household size was 2.50 and the average family size was 3.03.

About 21.0% of the population was under age 18, 8.0% was from age 18 to 24, 35.2% was from age 15 to 44, and 19.8% was age 65 or older. The median age was 43.1 years. The gender makeup was 47.9% male and 52.1% female. For every 100 females, there were 92.1 males.

The median household income was $68,531, and the median family income was $81,122. About 12.4% of the population were below the poverty line, including 20.2% of those under age 18 and 4.7% of those age 65 or over.

2010 census

Government

County Government
Salem County is governed by a five-member Board of Commissioners who are elected at-large to serve three-year terms of office on a staggered basis, with either one or two seats coming up for election each year. At an annual reorganization meeting held at the beginning of January, the board selects a director and a deputy director from among its members. The appointed position professional county administrator was abolished by a unanimous vote of the commissioners in January 2014. In 2016, commissioners were paid $25,410 and the director was paid an annual salary of $26,410.

In the 2016 general election, Salem County voters approved a binding referendum to cut the number of Commissioner from seven to five as well as a non-binding referendum to cut Commissioner salaries by 20%; both initiatives, which had been placed on the ballot as the result of grassroots campaigns opposed to a proposed outsourcing deal, passed by a 3–1 margin. In the wake of the referendum results, Director Julie Acton resigned in December 2016 and was replaced by Scott Griscom. In April 2017, the New Jersey Supreme Court ruled that the reduction in seats will be accomplished through attrition, with the seats expiring at the end of 2017 (held by Commissioners Cross, Painter, and Vanderslice) being eliminated; in the November 2017 general election there will be one new three-year seat up for a vote as well as a two-year unexpired term, so that on January 1, 2018, there will be a five-member board.

, Salem County's Commissioners (with terms for director and deputy director ending every December 31st) are:

Pursuant to Article VII Section II of the New Jersey State Constitution, each county in New Jersey is required to have three elected administrative officials known as "constitutional officers." These officers are the County Clerk and County Surrogate (both elected for five-year terms of office) and the County Sheriff (elected for a three-year term). Salem County's constitutional officers, elected on a countywide basis are:

The Salem County Prosecutor is Kristin J. Telsey, who was nominated to fill the position in September 2022. Salem County is a part of Vicinage 15 of the New Jersey Superior Court (along with Cumberland County and Gloucester County), seated in Woodbury in Gloucester County; the Assignment Judge for the vicinage is Benjamin C. Telsey. The Salem County Courthouse is in Salem.

Federal representatives 
Salem County falls entirely within the 2nd congressional district

State represenatatives 
All of Salem County is located in the 3rd legislative district.

Politics 
As of January 2023, there were a total of 48,956 registered voters in Salem County, of whom 14,768 (30.2%) were registered as Democrats, 14,839 (30.3%) were registered as Republicans and 18,525 (37.8%) were registered as unaffiliated. There were 824 voters (1.7%) registered to other parties. Among the county's 2010 Census population, 64.6% were registered to vote, including 84.4% of those ages 18 and over.

Salem County generally and historically leaned towards the Republican Party, but not as much so as the Northwest or Shore regions of the state.  In the 2008 presidential election, Democrat Barack Obama carried the county by a 4% margin over Republican John McCain, with Obama receiving 57.27% statewide. Obama received 16,044 votes here (50.4%), ahead of McCain with 14,816 votes (46.6%) and other candidates with 503 votes (1.6%), among the 31,812 ballots cast by the county's 44,324 registered voters, for a turnout of 71.8%. In the 2012 presidential election, Democrat Barack Obama narrowly finished ahead of Republican Mitt Romney; the state voted for Obama. Since 2012, the county has swung more toward Republicans, following the trend of most rural counties in the United States. Republican Donald Trump won 54.9% of the vote in 2016, the highest vote share for a Republican since George H. W. Bush in 1988. Trump improved to 55.3% of the vote in winning the county again in 2020. 

|}

In the 2009 gubernatorial election, Republican Chris Christie received 9,599 votes here (46.1%), ahead of Democrat Jon Corzine with 8,323 votes (39.9%), Independent Chris Daggett with 2,011 votes (9.7%) and other candidates with 411 votes (2.0%), among the 20,838 ballots cast by the county's 44,037 registered voters, yielding a 47.3% turnout. In the 2013 gubernatorial election, Republican Chris Christie received 12,748 votes in the county (66.6%), ahead of Democrat Barbara Buono with 5,889 votes (30.7%). In the 2017 gubernatorial election, Republican Kim Guadagno received 8,629 (50.1%) of the vote, and Democrat Phil Murphy received 7,814 (45.3%) of the vote. In the 2021 gubernatorial election, Republican Jack Ciattarelli received 64.1% of the vote (12,620 ballots cast) to Democrat Phil Murphy's 35.0% (6,893 votes).

Education

School districts
School districts include:

K-12
Penns Grove-Carneys Point Regional School District
Pennsville School District
Pittsgrove Township School District
Salem City School District
Salem County Special Services School District
Woodstown-Pilesgrove Regional School District – Regional

Secondary
Salem County Vocational Technical Schools

Elementary

Alloway Township School District
Elmer School District
Elsinboro Township School District
Lower Alloways Creek Township School District
Mannington Township School District
Oldmans Township School District
Quinton Township School District
Upper Pittsgrove School District

Transportation

Salem is served by many roads. Major county routes include CR 540, CR 551, CR 553 (only in Pittsgrove) and CR 581. State highways include Route 45, Route 48 (only in Carneys Point), Route 49, Route 56 (only in Pittsgrove), Route 77 and Route 140 (only in Carneys Point). The U.S. routes are U.S. Route 40 and the southern end of U.S. Route 130.

Limited access roads include Interstate 295 and the New Jersey Turnpike. Both highways pass through the northern part of the county. Only one turnpike interchange is located in Salem: Exit 1 in Carneys Point (which is also where the turnpike ends). There are a pair of service areas on the Turnpike, both located between exits 1 and 2 in Oldmans Township: The John Fenwick Service Area on the northbound side and the Clara Barton Service Area in the southbound direction. The Route 55 freeway passes through the northeastern part of the county briefly but has no interchanges within the county.

The Delaware Memorial Bridge (which is signed as I-295/US 40) is a set of twin suspension bridges crossing the Delaware River. Connecting New Castle, Delaware and Pennsville Township, the original span was opened in 1951 and the second span in 1968.

NJ Transit operates three routes through Salem County: the 401, which stops in Salem, Woodstown, Swedesboro, and Woodbury en route to and from Philadelphia; the 402, which stops in Penns Grove and has two stops in Salem en route to and from Philadelphia; and the 468, which has local stops throughout Salem County.

Municipalities

The 15 municipalities in Salem County (with 2010 Census data for population, housing units and area in square miles) are: Other, unincorporated communities in the county are listed next to their parent municipality. Some of these areas are census-designated places (CDPs) that have been created by the United States Census Bureau for enumeration purposes within a Township. Other communities and enclaves that exist within a municipality are also listed next to the name.

Recreation

Wineries
 Auburn Road Vineyards
 Chestnut Run Farm
 Monroeville Vineyard & Winery
 Salem Oak Vineyards

Notable people
Whitey Witt, former baseball outfielder and member of the New York Yankees' first World Series championship team, 1923

See also

National Register of Historic Places listings in Salem County, New Jersey
Wistarburgh Glass Works – an 18th-century glass company operating in the county.

References

External links

Salem County official website
The Official Salem County Tourism and Travel Website
Discover Salem County NJ
The News of Salem County

 
1694 establishments in New Jersey
Populated places established in 1694
South Jersey